Francisco Miguel Pereira Boavida Pires Belo (born 27 March 1991) is a Portuguese athlete specialising in the shot put. He represented his country at the 2017 World Championships without qualifying for the final. In addition, he finished fourth at the 2019 European Indoor Championships.

International competitions

Personal bests

Outdoor
Shot put – 21.27 (Kladno 2021)
Discus throw – 62.01 (Vagos 2017) NR

Indoor
Shot put – 21.28 (Toruń 2021) NR

References

1991 births
Living people
People from Castelo Branco, Portugal
Portuguese male shot putters
Portuguese male discus throwers
World Athletics Championships athletes for Portugal
Universiade medalists in athletics (track and field)
S.L. Benfica athletes
Universiade gold medalists for Portugal
Athletes (track and field) at the 2018 Mediterranean Games
Competitors at the 2015 Summer Universiade
Medalists at the 2017 Summer Universiade
Mediterranean Games competitors for Portugal
Athletes (track and field) at the 2020 Summer Olympics
Olympic athletes of Portugal
Sportspeople from Castelo Branco District